There have been four baronetcies created for persons with the surname Seton, all in the Baronetage of Nova Scotia. As of 2008 one creation is extant, one dormant and two extinct.

The Seton Baronetcy, of Abercorn in the County of Linlithgow, was created in the Baronetage of Nova Scotia on 3 June 1663 for Walter Seton, with remainder to heirs male whatsoever. The present Baronet is the male representative of Sir Alexander Seton, wife of Elizabeth, sister and heiress of John Gordon of Gordon. In 1408 they obtained a charter of the lands of Gordon and Sir Alexander is held to have been created a Lord of Parliament as Lord Gordon sometime before 1429. Their son Alexander assumed the surname of Gordon and was created Earl of Huntly in 1445. By his first marriage to Egidia Hay he is the ancestor of the Seton Baronets of Abercorn. By his second wife Elizabeth Crichton he had another son, George, on whom he obtained a charter settling the earldom (see the Marquess of Huntly for further history of this branch of the family). In 1923 Sir Bruce Gordon Seton, 9th Baronet, petitioned the Crown for his right to the title of Lord Gordon. Although the Committee for Privileges of the House of Lords admitted that he was the heir male of the first Earl of Huntly they decided that he had not provided enough evidence of the creation and existence of the title of Lord Gordon. The eleventh Baronet was the actor Bruce Seton. Sir Iain Seton of Abercorn, the 13th and current Baronet, is resident in Bridgetown, Western Australia. See also the Seton Baronetcy of Pitmedden below.

The Seton Baronetcy, of Garleton in the County of Haddington, was created in the Baronetage of Nova Scotia on 9 December 1664 for John Seton. On the death of the second Baronet in c. 1720 the heir was under attainder and the title was consequently forfeited.

The Seton Baronetcy, of Windygowl in the County of Peebles, was created in the Baronetage of Nova Scotia on 24 January 1671 for Robert Seton. The title became extinct on his early death later the same year.

The Seton Baronetcy, of Pitmedden in the County of Aberdeen, was created in the Baronetage of Nova Scotia on 15 January 1683 for Alexander Seton, a Member of the Scottish Parliament for Aberdeenshire and a Lord of the Justiciary under the judicial title of Lord Pitmedden. Seton was the great-grandson of James Seton, 1st of Pitmedden, fifth son of William Seton, of Meldrum, a descendant of the aforementioned Sir Alexander Seton, who is also the ancestor of the Seton baronets of Abercorn (see above) and the Marquesses of Huntly. The second Baronet was one of the Commissioners for the Treaty of Union between England and Scotland and sat as member of parliament for the combined Scottish constituencies at the first Parliament of Great Britain. The presumed twelfth Baronet never successfully proved his succession and was consequently not on the Official Roll of the Baronetage. Likewise, as of 13 June 2007 the presumed thirteenth and present Baronet Sir Charles has not proven his succession and is not on the Official Roll of the Baronetage, with the baronetcy considered dormant since 1993. The said Sir Charles is currently resident in Fort Pierce, Florida. For more information, follow this link.

Seton baronets, of Abercorn (1663)

Sir Walter Seton, 1st Baronet (died 1692)
Sir Walter Seton, 2nd Baronet (died 1708)
Sir Henry Seton, 3rd Baronet (died 1751)
Sir Henry Seton, 4th Baronet (died 1788)
Sir Alexander Seton, 5th Baronet (1772–1810)
Sir Henry John Seton, 6th Baronet (1796–1868)
Sir Charles Hay Seton, 7th Baronet (1797–1869)
Sir Bruce Maxwell Seton, 8th Baronet (1836–1915)
Sir Bruce Gordon Seton, FRSE 9th Baronet (1868–1932)
Sir Alexander Hay Seton, 10th Baronet (1904–1963)
Sir Bruce Lovat Seton, 11th Baronet (1909–1969)
Sir Christopher Bruce Seton, 12th Baronet (1909–1988)
Sir Iain Bruce Seton, 13th Baronet (born 1942)

Seton baronets, of Garleton (1664)

Sir John Seton, 1st Baronet (1639–1686)
Sir George Seton, 2nd Baronet (died c. 1720)

Seton baronets, of Windygowl (1671)
Sir Robert Seton, 1st Baronet (1641–1671)

Seton baronets, of Pitmedden (1683)
Sir Alexander Seton, 1st Baronet (died 1719)
Sir William Seton, 2nd Baronet (1673–1744)
Sir Alexander Seton, 3rd Baronet (1703–1750)
Sir William Seton, 4th Baronet (died 1774)
Sir Archibald Seton, 5th Baronet (died 1775)
Sir William Seton, 6th Baronet (died 1818)
Sir William Coote Seton, 7th Baronet (1808–1880)
Sir James Lumsden Seton, 8th Baronet (1835–1884)
Sir William Samuel Seton, 9th Baronet (1837–1914)
Sir John Hastings Seton, 10th Baronet (1888–1956)
Sir Robert James Seton, 11th Baronet (1926–1993)
James Christall Seton, presumed 12th Baronet (1913–1998)
Charles Wallace Seton, presumed 13th Baronet (born 1948)

See also
Marquess of Huntly

Notes

References
Kidd, Charles, Williamson, David (editors). Debrett's Peerage and Baronetage (1990 edition). New York: St Martin's Press, 1990, 

Seton
Extinct baronetcies in the Baronetage of Nova Scotia
Forfeited baronetcies
1663 establishments in Nova Scotia